Portugal's involvement in the Iran–Iraq War includes Portugal supplying both Iran and Iraq with arms, and playing a role in the Iran–Contra affair. From 1981 to 1986 75% of Portuguese arms exports (35.7bn escudos' worth) went to the Middle East; most of it, directly or indirectly, to Iran or Iraq.

History
On 12 November 1980 a joint Defense and Foreign Ministry declaration, joining the United States' embargo, declared that Portugal would not sell or ship weapons to Iran. On 4 December 1980 the 1980 Camarate air crash saw a small private aircraft carrying Portuguese Prime Minister Francisco de Sá Carneiro and Defense Minister Adelino Amaro da Costa crash in Camarate, Lisbon. Initial investigations concluded the incident was an accident, but later parliamentary investigations found evidence of a bomb beneath the cockpit. In 2004 the VIIIth parliamentary inquiry into the affair, headed by Nuno Melo concluded in its unanimous final report that the incident had been caused by an explosive device on the aircraft. Melo told the Xth enquiry in 2013 to investigate the role of arms sales to Iran and the Army's "Fundo de Defesa do Ultramar" slush fund, saying that da Costa had asked the Army about arms sales to Iran on 2 December 1980, and that on 5 December, the day after his death, the Army had issued an order illegally declaring arms sales to be under its jurisdiction, not the Defence Minister's.

Portugal became a major arms supplier to Iraq, selling 3.5bn escudos' worth in 1982 and 6bn in 1983. With Iraq's increasing difficulties keeping up payments for Portuguese arms, on 29 September 1983 the Portuguese government of Mário Soares secretly authorised sales to Iran. Several months later Portugal's President Ramalho Eanes expressed surprise at learning at the presence at Lisbon Airport of an Iranian aircraft carrying arms. Security arrangements for an Iran Air jumbo jet were such that Iraqi diplomats in Lisbon learned of them. In 1984 Portugal sold Iran 1.5bn escudos' worth of arms, making it Portugal's second-largest customer after Iraq.

Iran–Contra
The Portuguese Expresso revealed in January 1987 that in 1984–86 $8.3m of Portuguese arms had been supplied to the Nicaraguan Contras by US officials involved in Iran–Contra. The arms amounted to 1,900 tons, arms and ammunition, including 1,500 tons shipped in 1985. Sales were arranged by the Lisbon-based Defex Portugal, an importer/exporter of arms, which showed the Portuguese government end-user certificates certifying supply to Guatemala. Expresso said that Portugal had also been a transit point for Israeli and Eastern Bloc weapons destined for the Contras, identifying 15 flights of arms from Israel going through Lisbon airport.

In November 1985 an attempt to ship Israeli-sourced HAWK missiles to Iran via Portugal failed after the aircraft carrying them took off without having obtained landing rights there, and was forced to turn back. The New York Times said in January 1987 that "A senior administration official said recently that Portugal had been serving as a primary transshipment point for arms to the contras."

References

See also
 Silent Majority
 1980 Camarate air crash

Foreign relations during the Iran–Iraq War
Foreign relations of Portugal
Iran–Contra affair
Iran-Iraq
Iran-Iraq
Iraq–Portugal military relations
Iran–Portugal military relations